Keylin Suzette Gómez (born 1989) is a beauty pageant titleholder who was crowned Miss Universo Honduras 2011 and represented her country in the 2011 Miss Universe pageant.

Miss Universo Honduras 2011
Gómez, who stands , competed as one of the finalists in her country's national beauty pageant Miss Universo Honduras 2011, held on July 27, 2011, at Centro Social Hondureño Arabe in San Pedro Sula, gaining the right to represent her country in Miss Universe 2011.

Miss Universe 2011
As the official representative of Honduras to the 2011 Miss Universe pageant, broadcast live from São Paulo, Brazil on September 12, 2011, Gómez vied to succeed current Miss Universe titleholder, Ximena Navarrete of Mexico.

References

External links

Living people
Miss Universe 2011 contestants
Honduran beauty pageant winners
1989 births